Geoffrey Jukes (born 21 November 1950 in Winton) is a New Zealand sport shooter. He competed at the 2000 Summer Olympics in the men's skeet event, in which he tied for 19th place.

References

1950 births
Living people
Skeet shooters
New Zealand male sport shooters
Shooters at the 2000 Summer Olympics
Olympic shooters of New Zealand
Commonwealth Games medallists in shooting
Commonwealth Games silver medallists for New Zealand
Shooters at the 1994 Commonwealth Games
Medallists at the 1994 Commonwealth Games